Southampton was a parliamentary constituency which was represented in the British House of Commons.  Centred on the town of Southampton, it returned two members of parliament (MPs) from 1295 until it was abolished for the 1950 general election.

Boundaries
1885-1918: The existing Parliamentary borough, the parish of Milbrook, the ecclesiastical district of Holy Saviour, Bittern, the parish of St. Mary Extra, and the detached part of the parish of Hound included within the parish of St. Mary Extra.

Members of Parliament

MPs 1295–1660

MPs 1660–1832

MPs 1832–1950

Elections

Elections in the 1830s 
Chamberlayne's death caused a by-election.

 On petition, Hoy was unseated in favour of Penleaze

Elections in the 1840s

 

 

The election was declared void on petition on 6 May 1842, due to bribery by Bruce and Martyn's agents, and a writ for a by-election was not moved until 1 August 1842.

Elections in the 1850s
Cockburn was appointed Solicitor General for England and Wales, requiring a by-election.

Cockburn was appointed Attorney General for England and Wales, requiring a by-election.

 
 

Cockburn was appointed Attorney General for England and Wales, requiring a by-election.

 

Cockburn was appointed Recorder of Bristol, requiring a by-election.

Cockburn resigned after being appointed a Chief Justice of the Court of Common Pleas, causing a by-election.

Elections in the 1860s
Willcox's death caused a by-election.

Elections in the 1870s

 

Gurney's death caused a by-election.

Elections in the 1880s

 

Butt resigned after being appointed a Judge of the Probate, Divorce and Admiralty division of the High Court of Justice, causing a by-election.

Commerell resigned, causing a by-election.

Elections in the 1890s

Elections in the 1900s

Elections in the 1910s

Elections in the 1920s

Elections in the 1930s

Elections in the 1940s

Notes and references

Notes

Sources 
 

Parliamentary constituencies in Hampshire (historic)
Constituencies of the Parliament of the United Kingdom established in 1295
Constituencies of the Parliament of the United Kingdom disestablished in 1950
Politics of Southampton